The Valdostan regional election of 1954 took place on 6 November 1954.

The Christian Democracy broke up with the Valdostan Union and it won this its centrist allies.

Results
Electoral system: limited voting (jackpot for winners: 25 seats)

Sources: Regional Council of Aosta Valley and Istituto Cattaneo

Elections in Aosta Valley
1954 elections in Italy